Hakkila may refer to:

 Hakkila, Vantaa, a district of the city of Vantaa
 Tuija Hakkila (born 1959), Finnish pianist
 Väinö Hakkila (1882–1958), Finnish politician